Eupleurus subterraneus is a species of scarab beetle found in Europe, Asia, and North America. This species was formerly a member of the genus Aphodius.

Subspecies
These two subspecies belong to the species Eupleurus subterraneus:
 Eupleurus subterraneus krasnojarskicus (Dellacasa, 1986)  (Russia)
 Eupleurus subterraneus subterraneus (Linnaeus, 1758)  (Asia, Europe, and North America)

References

Scarabaeidae
Beetles described in 1758
Beetles of Europe
Taxa named by Carl Linnaeus